This Desert Life is the third studio album from American rock band Counting Crows. The cover art is by noted comic book artist Dave McKean, best known for his work with Neil Gaiman, and was adapted from the cover art McKean did for Gaiman's picture book The Day I Swapped My Dad for Two Goldfish. The album had sold more than 2 million copies worldwide by February 2002.  The song "Hanginaround" was the first of three singles released from the album, and the highest-charting single off the album, reaching number 1 on the US Billboard Adult Alternative Songs chart and number 28 on the Billboard Hot 100, as well as top ten in Canada and top 50 in a number of other countries.

The album contains the same personnel as the band's previous studio album, Recovering the Satellites, being David Bryson (guitar), Adam Duritz (vocals), Charlie Gillingham (keyboards), Matt Malley (bass), Ben Mize (drums) and Dan Vickrey (guitars), with multi-instrumentalist David Immerglück, who formerly was credited as a session player on the previous two albums, promoted to full member. It received generally positive reviews from critics.

Background
2 years after the release of Counting Crows' second studio album, Recovering the Satellites, in 1998, the band collaborated with producers David Lowery and Dennis Herring in a rented house in Hollywood, Los Angeles to record their third album. Describing the content of the album in comparison to other releases by the band, lead singer and primary song writer Adam Duritz remarked, "I think the first [album] was really about yearning for a change where you are, and I think the second album was very much about having gotten that change and being thrown up in the stratosphere and kind of come crashing down, and I think [This Desert Life] is about sort of recognizing that life is about confusion and change".. In addition, producer David Lowery also compared Counting Crows' past works from a more commercial aspect, stating, "Commercially it's been very successful for [Counting Crows] to be very introspective and sort of sad, so on this record, I thought we'd get a least a little bit of this humor and reverence to come through".

Track Listing
All songs written by Adam Duritz except as indicated.
 "Hanginaround" (Duritz, Dan Vickrey, Ben Mize, David Bryson) – 4:07
 "Mrs. Potter's Lullaby"  – 7:46
 "Amy Hit the Atmosphere" (Duritz, Matt Malley) – 4:36
 "Four Days" – 3:28
 "All My Friends" – 4:49
 "High Life" (Duritz, Vickrey) – 6:20
 "Colorblind" (Duritz, Charlie Gillingham) – 3:23
 "I Wish I Was a Girl" (Duritz, Gillingham) – 5:53
 "Speedway" (Duritz, Vickrey) – 3:44
 "St. Robinson in His Cadillac Dream" – 15:40
 "Kid Things" (hidden track)

The CD cover lists tracks one through five as "side one" and tracks six through ten as "side two". "Kid Things" is a hidden track as part of "St. Robinson in His Cadillac Dream". The vinyl release of this album also contains "Kid Things" as a hidden track along with another hidden track called "Baby I'm a Big Star Now", which is featured in the film Rounders. They are both on the side D with a text asking you not to play that side.

"Colorblind" was featured in the 1999 movie Cruel Intentions and the 2014 film Mommy.

Personnel
Counting Crows
Dave Bryson – guitar, slide guitar
Adam Duritz – vocals, piano, art direction
Charlie Gillingham – synthesizer, piano, Hammond organ, Mellotron, guitar, Chamberlin, Wurlitzer, vocals
David Immerglück – bass, mandolin, guitar, pedal steel
Matt Malley – bass, vocals, guitar
Ben Mize – drums, percussion, vocals
Dan Vickrey – guitar, sitar, vocals

Additional musicians
Chris Seefried – backing vocalist
David Lowery - backing vocalist, producer
Dennis Herring – producer, keyboards, loops, mixing
Gary DeRosa – backing vocalist
Cinjun Tate – backing vocalist
Bob Ludwig – mastering
Matt Funes – viola
Eve Butler – violin
Joel Derouin – violin
Larry Corbett – cello
David Campbell – string arrangements, conductor, orchestration
Joe Chiccarelli – engineer
Jim Champagne – engineer
Clay Jones – guitar, mandolin
Ok Hee Kim – engineer
David McKean– art direction, illustrations
Bill Merryfield – art direction, creative director
Martin Pradler – engineer
Jack Joseph Puig – mixing
Richard Hasal - Recording engineer
Rocky Schenck – photography
Jim Scott – mixing
Jeff Sheehan – engineer
Janette Sheridan – production coordination

Release history

Charts

Certifications

References

External links

1999 albums
Albums with cover art by Dave McKean
Counting Crows albums
Geffen Records albums
Albums produced by David Lowery (musician)
Albums produced by Dennis Herring